The Kriva Palanka Municipality is in the extreme northeastern part of North Macedonia. Kriva Palanka is the town where the municipal seat is found. The municipality is part of the Northeastern Statistical Region.

Geography
The municipality borders Serbia to the north, Bulgaria to the east, Rankovce Municipality to the west, and Makedonska Kamenica Municipality, Kratovo Municipality and Kočani Municipality to the south.

Demographics
According to the 2021 Macedonian census, Municipality of Kriva Palanka has 28,059 residents. Ethnic groups in the municipality:

Twin towns – sister cities
Kriva Palanka is twinned with:

 Bansko, Bulgaria
 Dupnitsa, Bulgaria
 Lugoj, Romania
 Mława, Poland
 Perechyn, Ukraine
 Svidník, Slovakia
 Vršac, Serbia
 Županja, Croatia

Inhabited places

References

External links

Official website

 
Northeastern Statistical Region
Municipalities of North Macedonia